The 1954 Roller Hockey World Cup was the tenth roller hockey world cup, organized by the Fédération Internationale de Patinage a Roulettes (now under the name of Fédération Internationale de Roller Sports). It was contested by 15 national teams (12 from Europe, 2 from South America and 1 from Africa) and it is also considered the 1954 European Roller Hockey Championship (despite the presence of non-European teams). All the games were played in the city of Barcelona, in Spain, the chosen city to host the World Cup.

Results

Standings

See also
 FIRS Roller Hockey World Cup
CERH European Roller Hockey Championship

External links
 1954 World Cup in rink-hockey.net historical database

Roller Hockey World Cup
International roller hockey competitions hosted by Spain
1954 in Spanish sport
1954 in roller hockey